Aitor Pérez Arrieta (born 24 July 1977) is a Spanish professional road bicycle racer who currently rides for the Gios Deyser-Leon Kastro team.

Major results

 2007 Giro d'Italia – 32nd
 GP Internacional do Oeste RTP – 1 stage (2005)

References

External links 

Cyclists from the Basque Country (autonomous community)
Spanish male cyclists
1977 births
Living people
People from Goierri
Sportspeople from Gipuzkoa